Subtanjalla District is one of fourteen districts of the province Ica in Peru.

References

1959 establishments in Peru
States and territories established in 1959